New York State Route 635 (NY 635) is a state highway located in the vicinity of Syracuse in Onondaga County, New York, in the United States. It extends for  along Thompson Road from an intersection with Erie Boulevard (NY 5) in Syracuse to Carrier Circle in DeWitt, where NY 635 connects to both the New York State Thruway (Interstate 90 or I-90) and NY 298. Along the way NY 635 also meets I-690. The route was assigned in 1980 after the section of Thompson Road between NY 290 and Carrier Circle was acquired by the state of New York.

Route description
NY 635 begins at an intersection with NY 5 (Erie Boulevard) two blocks north of the campus of LeMoyne College in Syracuse. As Thompson Road, NY 635 heads north and connects to I-690 via the full cloverleaf interchange that comprises exit 16. Just past I-690, NY 635 crosses over the Peat Street Runner, a CSX Transportation railroad spur that largely parallels I-690 into downtown Syracuse, prior to intersecting Burnet Avenue, a street connecting NY 635 to the nearby village of East Syracuse.

North of Burnet Avenue, NY 635 narrows slightly from six lanes to four lanes with a median as it heads along the eastern edge of the Eastwood neighborhood of Syracuse. The road also acts as a divider between the residential neighborhoods of eastern Syracuse and the industrial factories situated along CSX Transportation's Mohawk Subdivision rail line in DeWitt. This division ends upon entering DeWitt, where NY 635 meets NY 290 at an intersection centered on a bridge over the four-track main line. From this point north to its terminus at Carrier Circle, NY 635 is surrounded completely by commercial and industrial properties, including the sprawling Carrier Corporation complex just south of the circle. At the circle, NY 635 officially terminates upon meeting NY 298; however, it also connects to the New York State Thruway (I-90) at exit 35 by way of the loop.

History
The segment of NY 635 from NY 290 north to Carrier Circle was originally maintained by Onondaga County as part of County Route 13 (CR 13), a discontinuous route extending from NY 290 in DeWitt north to Northern Boulevard in Cicero with a gap at Syracuse Hancock International Airport. On April 1, 1980, ownership and maintenance of the portion of CR 13 south of Carrier Circle was transferred to the state of New York as part of a highway maintenance swap between the county and the state. This piece of CR 13, as well as a previously state-maintained roadway from NY 290 south to NY 5, was designated NY 635.

Major intersections

See also

References

External links

635
Transportation in Onondaga County, New York
Transportation in Syracuse, New York
DeWitt, New York